The Nashville Kickoff Game was an annual United States college football game played on the opening weekend of the college football season in Nashville, TN at Nissan Stadium, home of the Tennessee Titans.

Game results 

Rankings are from the AP Poll.

Records

By team

By conference

References 

College football kickoff games
Sports competitions in Nashville, Tennessee
Recurring sporting events established in 2014
2014 establishments in Tennessee
2015 disestablishments in Tennessee
Recurring sporting events disestablished in 2015
American football in Tennessee